Attorney General Stow may refer to:

Randolph Isham Stow (1828–1878), Attorney General of South Australia
Gardner Stow (1789–1866), Attorney General of New York